Samuel José Mejía (born February 7, 1983) is a Dominican American retired professional basketball player. He played college basketball at DePaul University.

Amateur career
Mejía attended Theodore Roosevelt High School in the Bronx. He was there from 1997 to 2000 and led the Rough Riders basketball team to the PSAL's "B" division championship in 2000.

Mejía left there to attend the Storm King School, Cornwall-on-Hudson, New York, from which he graduated. He was coached there by Kevin Houston who led the nation in scoring in 1986–87.

Professional career
Mejía was drafted by the Detroit Pistons in the 2007 NBA draft, with the 57th overall pick. The Pistons waived Mejía on October 29, 2007. In 2007–08, he briefly played with the Fort Wayne Mad Ants of the NBA D-League. On January 30, 2008, he signed with the Italian club Pierrel Capo d'Orlando, for the rest of the season.

Mejía signed with the Greek League club AEL 1964 GS for the 2008–09 season, where he averaged 14.3 points and 3.4 rebounds in 20 Greek League games.

On September 29, 2009, Mejía moved to France and signed a one-year deal with Cholet Basket. On July 1, 2010, he re-signed with Cholet for one more season. During the 2010–11 EuroLeague, Meija was named the EuroLeague MVP of the 5th week games. He was named the 2011 French League Foreign MVP, and was selected to play at the 2010 LNB All-Star Game, as a forward in the starting line-up of the "Foreign" team, at Paris-Bercy, representing Cholet Basket.

On June 22, 2011 he signed a two-year contract with the Russian club CSKA Moscow. On June 22, 2012, he parted ways with CSKA. The next day, he signed a contract with the Turkish club Banvit.

On January 7, 2015, in a EuroCup away game against Budućnost Podgorica, he was involved in an incident. With two minutes of game remaining, a hooligan ran onto the court and hit him from the back, after which his teammate Rowland punched the hooligan. Mejía later joined Rowland in the brawl. Referees later ejected both players from the court. He was fined by the Euroleague Basketball organization for taking part in the incident, with three games of suspension, and a 30,000-euro fine. On April 16, 2015, he was named to the All-EuroCup First Team.

On August 13, 2015, Mejia signed with Tofaş.

On July 17, 2020, he announced his retirement from professional basketball.

National team career
Mejía has been a member of the senior Dominican Republic national basketball team. He played at the 2007 CBC Championship.

References

External links
 Sammy Mejía at euroleague.net
 Sammy Mejía at fiba.com
 Sammy Mejía at nba.com
 Sammy Mejía at tblstat.net
 

1983 births
Living people
A.E.L. 1964 B.C. players
American expatriate basketball people in France
American expatriate basketball people in Greece
American expatriate basketball people in Italy
American expatriate basketball people in Russia
American expatriate basketball people in Turkey
American men's basketball players
American sportspeople of Dominican Republic descent
Basketball players from New York City
Bandırma B.İ.K. players
Cholet Basket players
DePaul Blue Demons men's basketball players
Detroit Pistons draft picks
Dominican Republic expatriate basketball people in France
Dominican Republic expatriate basketball people in Greece
Dominican Republic expatriate basketball people in Italy
Dominican Republic expatriate basketball people in Russia
Dominican Republic men's basketball players
Fort Wayne Mad Ants players
Orlandina Basket players
PBC CSKA Moscow players
Shooting guards
Small forwards
Sportspeople from the Bronx
Tofaş S.K. players
Storm King School alumni